The Bendix Electrojector is an electronically controlled manifold injection (EFI) system developed and made by Bendix Corporation. In 1957, American Motors (AMC) offered the Electrojector as an option in some of their cars; Chrysler followed in 1958. However, it proved to be an unreliable system that was soon replaced by conventional carburetors. The Electrojector patents were then sold to German car component supplier Bosch, who developed the Electrojctor into a functioning system, the Bosch D-Jetronic, introduced in 1967.

Description 

The Electrojector is an electronically controlled multi-point injection system that has an analogue engine control unit, the so-called "modulator" that uses the intake manifold vacuum and the engine speed for metering the right amount of fuel. The injectors are spring-loaded active injectors, actuated by a modulator-controlled electromagnet. Pulse-width modulation is used to change the amount of injected fuel: since the injection pressure is constant, the fuel amount can only be changed by increasing or decreasing the injection pulse duration. The modulator receives the injection pulse from an injection pulse generator that rotates in sync with the ignition distributor. The modulator converts the injection pulse into a correct injection signal for each fuel injector primarily by using the intake manifold and crankshaft speed sensor signals. It uses analogue transistor technology (i. e. no microprocessor) to do so. The system also supports setting the correct idle speed, mixture enrichment, and coolant temperature using additional resistors in the modulator.

History 

The Electrojector was first offered by American Motors Corporation (AMC) in 1957. The Rambler Rebel was used to promote AMC's new  engine. It produced peak torque 500 rpm lower than the equivalent carburetor engine The cost of the EFI option was US$395 and it was available on 15 June 1957. According to AMC, the price would be significantly less than Chevrolet's mechanical fuel injection option. Initial problems with the Electrojector meant only pre-production cars had it installed so very few cars were sold and none were made available to the public. The EFI system in the Rambler worked well in warm weather, but was difficult to start in cooler temperatures.

Chrysler offered Electrojector on the 1958 Chrysler 300D, DeSoto Adventurer, Dodge D-500, and Plymouth Fury. The early electronic components were not reliable in an underhood environment and were not easily modified as engine control requirements advanced. Most of the 35 vehicles originally equipped with Electrojector were retrofitted with 4-barrel carburetors. The Electrojector patents were subsequently sold to Bosch.

Bosch developed their D-Jetronic (D for Druckfühlergesteuert, German for "pressure-sensor-controlled"), from the Electrojector, which was first used on the VW 1600TL/E in 1967. This was a speed/density system, using engine speed and intake manifold air density to calculate "air mass" flow rate and thus fuel requirements. This system was adopted by VW, Mercedes-Benz, Porsche, Citroën, Saab, and Volvo. Lucas licensed the system for production in Jaguar cars, initially in D-Jetronic form, before switching to L-Jetronic in 1978 on the XK6 engine.

References 

Fuel injection systems
Embedded systems
Power control
Engine technology
Automotive technology tradenames
Bendix Corporation